The Congressional Unmanned Systems Caucus, also informally known as the drone caucus, is a group of members of the U.S. House of Representatives interested in the applications of unmanned vehicle systems, also known as drones (e.g UAVs and UCAVs). The caucus's website states "The Congressional Unmanned Systems Caucus’ goal is to educate members of Congress on every facet of this industry. We are this industry’s voice on Capitol Hill, and will work closely with industry to ensure we continue to expand this sector through efficient government regulation and oversight." 

There also appears to be a smaller corresponding group in the U.S. Senate, founded by Sens. Jim Inhofe (R-OK) and Joe Manchin (D-WV).

Membership

Officers 

 Co-chair: Buck McKeon (CA-25) (R)
 Co-chair: Henry Cuellar (TX-28) (D)

Other membership 

 Rob Bishop (UT-1) (R)
 Madeleine Bordallo (Guam) (D)
 Robert Brady (PA-1) (D)
 Mo Brooks (AL-5) (R)
 Larry Bucshon (IN-8) (R)
 Ken Calvert (CA-42) (R)
 Tom Cole (OK-4) (R)
 Mike Conaway (TX-11) (R)
 Gerald Connolly (VA-11) (D)
 Joe Courtney (CT-2) (D)
 Kevin Cramer (ND-At Large) (R)
 Ander Crenshaw (FL-4) (R)
 Blake Farenthold (TX-27) (R)
 Randy Forbes (VA-4) (R)
 Trent Franks (AZ-8) (R)
 Paul Gosar (AZ-4) (R)
 Gene Green (TX-29) (D)
 Colleen Hanabusa (HI-1) (D)
 Richard Hanna (NY-22) (R)
 Andy Harris (MD-1) (R)
 Vicky Hartzler (MO-4) (R)
 Joe Heck (NV-3) (R)
 Duncan Hunter (CA-50) (R)
 Darrell Issa (CA-49) (R)
 Lynn Jenkins (KS-2) (R)
 William Keating (MA-9) (D) 
 Doug Lamborn (CO-5) (R)
 Frank LoBiondo (NJ-2) (R)
 Frank Lucas (OK-3) (R)
 Kevin McCarthy (CA-23) (R)
 Michael T. McCaul (TX-10) (R)
 Candice Miller (MI-10) (R)
 Pete Olson (TX-22) (R)
 Steven Palazzo (MS-4) (R)
 Steve Pearce (NM-2) (R)
 Mike Pompeo (KS-4) (R)
 Scott Rigell (VA-2) (R)
 Dana Rohrabacher (CA-48) (R)
 Thomas Rooney (FL-17) (R)
 Loretta Sanchez (CA-46) (D)
 David Schweikert (AZ-6) (R)
 Mike Simpson (ID-2) (R)
 Michael R. Turner (OH-10) (R) 
 Joe Wilson (SC-2) (R)
 Robert J. Wittman (VA-1) 
 Don Young (AK-At Large) (R)

Source: https://web.archive.org/web/20130512081527/http://unmannedsystemscaucus.mckeon.house.gov/about/membership.shtml

References

External links 
 Congressional Unmanned Systems Caucus website

Unmanned aerial vehicles of the United States
Caucuses of the United States Congress